Salvador Albert Schlaefer Berg O.F.M. Cap. (July 27, 1920 – October 22, 1993) was a Roman Catholic bishop.

Born in Campbellsport, Wisconsin, United States, Schlaefer Berg was ordained a priest for the Capuchin order on June 5, 1946. On July 25, 1970, he was appointed titular bishop of Flumenpiscene' and bishop of the Roman Catholic Vicariate Apostolic of Bluefields, Nicaragua, on June 25, 1970 and was ordained bishop on August 12, 1970. He died while still in office.

Notes

1920 births
1993 deaths
People from Campbellsport, Wisconsin
American Roman Catholic priests
20th-century Roman Catholic bishops in Nicaragua
Catholics from Wisconsin
Capuchin bishops
Roman Catholic bishops of Bluefields